Carilion may refer to:

 Carilion Clinic in Roanoke, Virginia, US
 Carilion Roanoke Memorial Hospital in Roanoke, Virginia, US
 Carilion New River Valley Medical Center in Montgomery County, Virginia, US
 Virginia Tech Carilion School of Medicine and Research Institute in Roanoke, Virginia, US
 Carilion Court in Blacksburg, Virginia, US

See also
 Carillion, a defunct British company
 Carillon, a musical instrument of bells